Commemorative banknotes of Costa Rica of the Costa Rican colón have been issued by the Central Bank of Costa Rica since its creation in 1950. The following is a list of the different issues printed on all the currently circulating notes along with a short description.

Table of contents

150 Years of Independence

In 1971, to celebrate the 150 years of the independence of Costa Rica, the Central Bank issued a limited number of banknotes printed by Thomas de la Rue, London, with an overprint seal which reads “150 AÑOS DE INDEPENDENCIA 1821–1971”.

XXV Anniversary of the Central Bank

In 1975, to celebrate its 25th anniversary, the Central Bank issued a 5 Colones D series note, printed by Thomas de la Rue, London, with an overprint seal which reads “XXV ANIVERSARIO BANCO CENTRAL DE COSTA RICA 1950–1975”.

Centenario Banco Central de Costa Rica

In 1978, on the occasion of the centennial of Banco de Costa Rica, the Central Bank put on circulation a limited number of banknotes printed by Thomas de La Rue, London, with a commemorative inscription on the reverse which reads “1877–CENTENARIO BANCO DE COSTA RICA–1977”, eliminated in the next series. This note continued to be issued by the Central Bank until 1986.

L Anniversary of the Central Bank

In 2000, to celebrate its 50th anniversary, the Central Bank issued a limited number of banknotes printed by Thomas de la Rue, London, with an overprint seal which reads “50 BCCR ANIVERSARIO”.

 
Note: Every banknote of this serie (*) kept the agreement number and the signatures of the original issues. The only change was the commemorative seal.

See also

 Economy of Costa Rica
 Commemorative coins of Costa Rica

References

External links
 Museos del Banco Central de Costa Rica

Banknotes, Commem
Banknotes by country
Commemorative banknotes